Snow Hill High School (SHHS) is a four-year public high school in Snow Hill, Maryland, United States. It is one of four public high schools in Worcester County along with Pocomoke High School, Stephen Decatur High School, and the Worcester Technical High School.

Overview
The school is located on the Eastern Shore of Maryland in the town of Snow Hill, MD. The school is on Maryland Route 12 and between U.S. Route 113 and U.S. Route 113 Business. Beginning in 2014, and finishing in 2017, the building received a $44.8 million renovation.

Students

Snow Hill High School's graduation rate has been very high in past years. In 2007 the school graduated 95.58%, though in 2004 it graduated 100% of seniors.

Band
The Snow Hill High School Marching Eagles maintain a reputation of pride and excellence. During the past 26 years, the band has performed in 126 competitive events against bands from eighteen different states and the District of Columbia. In this time, the band has received 121 first place awards, four second place awards, and one third place award. The band has placed first in 83 of the last 84 competitions.

The Snow Hill High School Concert Band is also regarded as one of the premier high school band programs on Maryland's Eastern Shore, annually receiving "Superior" ratings at regional band adjudications.

Sports
State Champions

 2008 - Boys' Basketball 1A Champs
 2006 - Boys' Baseball
 2001 - Boys' Basketball
 1989 - Boys' Basketball
 1982 - Football
 1980 - Football
 1979 - Girls' Basketball

See also
List of high schools in Maryland
Worcester County Public Schools

References and notes

External links
Snow Hill High School website
Snow Hill High School official website
Map of School from Google Maps

Public high schools in Maryland
Educational institutions established in 1957
Schools in Worcester County, Maryland
1957 establishments in Maryland